The Burgess Hill Academy (formerly Oakmeeds Community College) is a co-educational secondary school located in central Burgess Hill, West Sussex, England.

History
Oakmeeds was created as a County Secondary School in 1958 and became a comprehensive school in 1971.

Oakmeeds took its name from the oak trees in the school grounds, running along the path of a Roman road, and from Meeds Pottery, which stood there before Oakmeeds was built. It mainly serves Burgess Hill; but also has students from nearby villages, including Hassocks and Hurstpierpoint, as well as the City of Brighton and Hove area, and Haywards Heath, to the north.

Oakmeeds celebrated its semicentennial in 2005. According to Ofsted, in 2010 there were 1059 students at Oakmeeds, between age 11 and 16. The Ofsted report in 2004 classed Oakmeeds as a "Good School" and in 2008 classed Oakmeeds as a "Borderline to Good School". It was recognised as a Business and Enterprise College and also has Eco School status and the Sportsmark. GCSE results were generally below average. In 2014 it was rated as inadequate by Ofsted and put in Special Measures.

At the end of 2008, T block suffered substantial damage to one side as a result of an arson attack. The arsonist, a former pupil at the school who was convicted in March 2011, destroyed art and RE coursework and put half of T block out of action until September 2010.

Previously a community school administered by West Sussex County Council, in September 2016 Oakmeeds Community College converted to academy status and renamed The Burgess Hill Academy. The school is now sponsored by the University of Brighton Academies Trust.

Notable former pupils
Will Wood, footballer

References

External links
The Burgess Hill Academy official website
The West Sussex County Council information site
The Oakmeeds Website (some information is out of date)
Ofsted inspeection report, 2007: Oakmeeds School
Teacher forced dying 11-year-old with alopecia to remove her wig because it might encourage other children to dye their hair

Educational institutions established in 1958
1958 establishments in England
Secondary schools in West Sussex
Burgess Hill
Academies in West Sussex